Annika von Hausswolff, born March 30, 1967, is a Swedish visual artist. She studied at Sven Winquists School of Photography in Gothenburg, Sweden from 1987 to 1989; Konstfack, University College of Arts, Craft & Design, Stockholm from 1991 to 1994 and the Royal Swedish Academy of Fine Arts from 1995 to 1996. She received a ten-year grant from the Swedish Arts Grants Committee in 2002. She has had solo shows at the Statens Museum for Kunst, Copenhagen, Denmark; Konsthallen-Bohusläns Museum, Uddevalla, Sweden; Norrköpings Konstmuseum, Norrköping, Sweden; and the Baltic Art Center, Visby, Sweden. She was awarded a solo show at the Venice Biennale in 1999.

References

Living people
Swedish contemporary artists
Year of birth missing (living people)
Annika